Cristina Martín Lara (born 1972) is a Spanish photographer who lives and works in Berlin. Her photographs seek to trigger emotional responses to the environment in which we live.

Biography
Lara was born in Málaga in 1972. She first studied medicine at the University of Málaga, then turned to fine arts at Granada's Alonso Cano University, graduating in 1992. She has participated in numerous exhibitions. Her Landpartie series tests our emotional responses to the environment in which we live.

Exhibitions
Recent solo exhibitions include: 
 2004 Si yo supiera a qué se debe..Wenn ich wüsste woran das liegt…(1). Galería JM. Málaga. Si yo supiera a qué se debe…Wenn ich nur wüsste woran das liegt…(0). Open Art München. Kiosk-Kanzler.
 2005 Si yo supiera a qué se debe…Wenn ich nur wüsste woran das liegt…(1). Galería Fúcares. Madrid.
 2005 Si yo supiera a qué se debe…Wenn ich nur wüsste woran das liegt…(1). Video. Espacio 5. CacMálaga. 
 2006 Si yo supiera a qué se debe…Wenn ich nur wüsste woran das liegt…(4). Sala B. Palacio de los Condes de Gabia. Granada.
 2008 Landpartie I. Galería Cámara Oscura. Festival Off PHE 08. Madrid. 
 2009 Landpartie. Galería Isabel Hurley. Málaga.

Literature

References

External links
 Examples of Cristina Martín Lara's work from Galeria Isabel Hurley

Spanish photographers
1972 births
Spanish women photographers
People from Málaga
Photographers from Berlin
Living people
Spanish expatriates in Germany